The Bangladesh National Commission of UNESCO is a Bangladesh government regulatory agency under the Ministry of Education responsible for coordinating development activities with UNESCO and other developments agencies and non-profits. Dipu Moni is the chairperson of the Bangladesh National Commission of UNESCO. Md. Mahbub Hossain is the General Secretary of the commission.

History
The Bangladesh National Commission of UNESCO was established in 1973. The chairman of the commission is the Minister of Education.

On 2 June 2014, Bangladesh National Commission for UNESCO, along with UNESCO and Save the Children, released a report titled Education For All Global Monitoring Report-2013/14 as part of achieving Education for All.

On 8 March 2015, Bangladesh National Commission for UNESCO and Korean National Commission for UNESCO organised an exhibition on Jamdani in Dhaka.

References

1973 establishments in Bangladesh
Organisations based in Dhaka
Government agencies of Bangladesh
National Commissions for UNESCO